Norio Ishizawa ( Ishizawa Norio, born August 16, 1952, in Yokohama) is a Japanese journalist and newscaster, currently working for NHK.

During his career, Ishiwaza was presenter of the morning news program NHK Morning Wide (Saturdays 1989–90), NHK News 9 (1993–95), Ohayo Nippon (1995–96) and NHK News 7 (weekends 2000–2002).

References

1952 births
Living people
Japanese journalists
Japanese television presenters
People from Yokohama
Japanese broadcast news analysts